Cleveland vs. Harrison may refer to one of two United States presidential elections between Grover Cleveland and Benjamin Harrison:

 1888 United States presidential election, won by Benjamin Harrison against Grover Cleveland
 1892 United States presidential election, won by Grover Cleveland against Benjamin Harrison